The Assassin's Quest is a play-by-mail game that was published by De Jager & Co.

Gameplay
The Assassin's Quest was a ship combat game with 30 players set in a 3D universe, in which each player has a target player to hunt and an assassin player to be hunted by.

Reception
David Bolduc reviewed The Assassin's Quest in The Space Gamer No. 33. Bolduc commented that "The Assassin's Quest is both difficult and unusual, but well worth the money for a player who's looking for a thrill."

References

Play-by-mail games